Lloyd David Moore (June 8, 1912 – May 18, 2008) was a NASCAR Grand National Series driver from 1949 to 1955, recording 1 win, 13 top-5 and 23 top-10 finishes. He was born in Frewsburg, New York, USA. At the time of his death, he was the oldest living former NASCAR driver.

In 1950, Moore was a teammate of NASCAR champion Bill Rexford under car owner Julian Buesink. He was the winner of one Grand National Series race that season, at the dirt half mile Winchester Speedway in Winchester, Indiana. He finished fourth in points for the season.

Moore was honored by his hometown of Frewsburg in March 2009 with a street named in his honor.

References

1912 births
2008 deaths
NASCAR drivers
People from Frewsburg, New York
Racing drivers from New York (state)